The Tunisian Basketball Federation Cup, also known as the Abderraouf-Menjour Cup (in French: Coupe Abderraouf-Menjour) or FTBB Cup, is an annual basketball cup in Tunisian men's basketball. 

It is contested by the teams that did not qualify for the play-off phase of the Championnat National A. Since 2018, the games are played during the FIBA national teams qualifiers which means most games are contested without team's internationals. In November 2020, the cup was re-named after Raouf Menjour.

Recent champions

Titles by club

References

Federation Cup